The 1964–65 Challenge Cup was the 64th staging of rugby league's oldest knockout competition, the Challenge Cup.

The final was contested by Wigan and Hunslet at Wembley Stadium. Wigan won the match 20–16, with Wigan's Ray Ashby and Hunslet's Brian Gabbitas jointly receiving the Lance Todd Trophy.

First round

Second round

Quarter-finals

Semi-finals

Final

References

External links
 Challenge Cup official website
 Challenge Cup 1964/65 results at Rugby League Project

Challenge Cup
1965 in English rugby league